Two Melanin-concentrating hormone receptors (MCHR) have recently been characterized: MCH-R1 and MCH-R2. These two receptors share approximately 38% homology.

 MCH-R1 is expressed in all mammals.
 MCH-R2 is only found in some primates and carnivores including dogs, ferrets and humans.

Clinical significance
Antagonists might be useful in the treatment of obesity and anxiety and depression.  An agonist might have possible utility as a treatment for osteoporosis and insomnia

Research is ongoing for antagonists affecting MCH receptors R1 and R2.

See also
 Melanin concentrating hormone
 Melanin

References

External links

 
 
 

G protein-coupled receptors